Bei Yan may refer to:

Northern Yan (407–436), one of the Sixteen Kingdoms  
Bei Yan (卑衍,  238), a general under the warlord Gongsun Yuan, see Sima Yi's Liaodong campaign